Temescal Valley (Temescal, Spanish for "sweat lodge") is a census-designated place in Riverside County, California. The 2010 United States census reported Temescal Valley's population was 22,535.

History

Rancho Temescal
Temescal Valley takes its name from the Rancho Temescal established by Leandro Serrano.  Serrano received the written permission of the priest of the Mission San Luis Rey de Francia, or of the military commander of San Diego, to occupy the five square league Rancho Temescal on land belonging to Mission of San Luis Rey.  He took possession in about 1818 or 1819 under a grant given by Governor José María de Echeandía to Leandro Serrano.  The Serrano Boulder (California Historical Landmark (#185), marks the site of the first house erected by Leandro Serrano about May 1824.   The grant extended along the Temescal Valley south of present day Corona and encompassed El Cerrito and Lee Lake.  The Serrano family held the land until they lost the court case validating their title to the land in 1866.  Meanwhile squatters settled on the land in anticipation of this result in 1855.

Temescal

Temescal Station and Settlement
In 1857, the Temescal Station of the Butterfield Overland Mail stage line was established five miles north of the Temescal Hot Springs, ten miles north of Rancho La Laguna station and twenty miles south of the Chino Rancho station.  The Temescal Overland station was "at the foot of the Temescal hills, a splendid place to camp, wood and water plenty, and protected from the winds."  Around this location the settlement of Temescal grew over the next few decades.  By 1860, Greenwade's Place in Temescal Canyon, 3 miles north of the stage station, was a polling place for southwestern San Bernardino County. It was a Post Office from February 12 until November 12, 1861 when the American Civil War shut down the Butterfield stage operations.

In 1866, the Temescal School District was organized, the fifth in San Bernardino County.  Its school house was built under a huge sycamore tree and served until 1889, when a new building took its place in the early 1900s. During the 1870s, orchards and bee hives began to replace cattle and sheep ranching. The bees were first brought into the valley in the early seventies and became an important source of income in the valley. From October 29, 1874, Temescal again had its own post office.

Temescal Tin Mine
In 1856, Abel Stearns was convinced that the rancho's property contained tin ores and bought an interest in Rancho Temescal from Serrano's widow for 200 cattle.  He was forced by his losses in the drought of 1863-64 to sell off his interest in the Temescal Rancho in 1864, for $100,000.  The tin mine, located east of Temescal, was developed after the 1866 ruling and produced tin by 1869.  However the land title remained in dispute and no more development to the mines happened until an 1888 Supreme Court ruling settled the title.

After the Supreme Court ruling, experts from England examined the tin district, and made favorable reports which encouraged the California Mining and Smelting Company to be incorporated in London, on July 24, 1890, also another corporation, the San Jacinto Estate, Limited, was formed, by prominent financiers of London, including some of the men interested in the Welsh tin mines.  The Rancho San Jacinto Sobrante, on which the mine was now located, was purchased, and the Temescal tin mine was at last opened up operating for the next two years. Temescal grew large with the influx of the miners, enough to have its own post office. Up to July 1892, 136 tons of tin were produced; the first shipment reached New York on March 30, 1892.  This was the first and last shipment; the Temescal tin mines were soon closed down in 1892, the valuable equipment and machinery were later sold and no effort has since been made to work the mine.

South Riverside, Corona and the decline of Temescal
In May 1886, the South Riverside Land and Water Company was incorporated, its members including ex-Governor of Iowa Samuel Merrill, R. B. Taylor, George L. Joy,  A. S. Garretson, and Adolph Rimpau; as a citrus growers’ organization, it purchased the lands of Rancho La Sierra of Bernardo Yorba, and the Rancho Temescal grant and the colony of South Riverside was laid out.  They also secured the water rights to Temescal Creek, its tributaries and Lee Lake.  Dams and pipelines were built to carry the water to the colony.  In 1889, the Temescal Water Company was incorporated, to supply water for the new colony.  This company purchased all the water-bearing lands in the valley and began drilling artesian wells.  The first wells flowed, at a depth of 300 feet. However, pumping plants soon had to be installed. In time, all the water of both Temescal and Coldwater Creeks was diverted into pipe lines. Cienagas and springs were drained, and, gradually, the valley became dry and desolate.  Farms and orchards in the central part of the Temescal Valley were abandoned, and the old adobes along the stage route crumbled and disappeared. By November 30, 1901 the Temescal post office was closed and postal operations moved to the Corona post office.

Geography and climate
According to the United States Census Bureau, the CDP covers an area of 19.3 square miles (50.1 km2), 99.82% of it land and 0.18% of it water.

Demographics
The 2010 United States Census reported that Temescal Valley had a population of 22,535. The racial makeup of Temescal Valley was 14,785 (65.6%) White, 1,507 (6.7%) African American, 131 (0.6%) Native American, 2,157 (9.6%) Asian, 74 (0.3%) Pacific Islander, 2,565 (11.4%) from other races, and 1,316 (5.8%) from two or more races. Hispanic or Latino of any race were 6,753 persons (30.0%).

The census reported that 22,530 people (100% of the population) lived in households, 5 (0%) lived in non-institutionalized group quarters, and 0 (0%) were institutionalized.

There were 7,142 households, of which 3,230 (45.2%) had children under the age of 18 living in them, 4,981 (69.7%) were opposite-sex married couples living together, 580 (8.1%) had a female householder with no husband present, 321 (4.5%) had a male householder with no wife present. There were 284 (4.0%) unmarried opposite-sex partnerships and 43 (0.6%) same-sex married couples or partnerships. 971 households (13.6%) were made up of individuals, and 370 (5.2%) had someone living alone who was 65 years of age or older. The average household size was 3.15. There were 5,882 families (82.4% of all households); the average family size was 3.47.

6,474 people (28.7%) were under the age of 18, 1,691 people (7.5%) aged 18 to 24, 6,453 people (28.6%) aged 25 to 44, 5,652 people (25.1%) aged 45 to 64, and 2,265 people (10.1%) who were 65 years of age or older. The median age was 36.2 years. For every 100 females there were 96.6 males. For every 100 females age 18 and over, there were 94.3 males.

The homeowner vacancy rate was 3.3%; the rental vacancy rate was 4.2%. 19,282 people (85.6% of the population) lived in owner-occupied housing units and 3,248 people (14.4%) lived in rental housing units.

References

Further reading
 

Census-designated places in Riverside County, California
Elsinore Trough